United Lutheran Church may refer to:

Church organizations
United Evangelical Lutheran Church, 1896 to 1960
United Lutheran Church in America, 1918 to 1962
United Norwegian Lutheran Church of America, 1890 to 1917

Specific places
United Lutheran Church (Grand Forks, North Dakota), listed on the NRHP in Grand Forks County, North Dakota
Christ Hamilton United Lutheran Church and Cemetery, Hamilton Square, Pennsylvania, NRHP-listed
Stiklestad United Lutheran Church, Doran, Minnesota, listed on the NRHP in Minnesota